Thorhild Widvey (born 9 January 1956) is a Norwegian politician for the Conservative Party who served as Minister of Culture from 2013 to 2015, and Minister of Petroleum and Energy from 2004 to 2005.

Political career

Local politics
On the local level Widvey was a member of Karmøy municipal council from 1979 to 1989, the last six years in the executive committee.

Parliament
She was elected to the Norwegian Parliament from Rogaland in 1989, and was re-elected on one occasion. She had previously served as a deputy representative to the during the term 1985–1989.

Bondevik cabinet
From 2002 to 2003, during the second cabinet Bondevik, Widvey was appointed State Secretary of the Ministry of Fisheries. From 2003 to 2004 she held the same position in the Ministry of Foreign Affairs. In 2004 she was appointed Norwegian Minister of Petroleum and Energy, an office she left, along with the rest of the second cabinet Bondevik, after their 2005 election defeat.

Solberg cabinet

Personal life
She was born in Avaldsnes in Karmøy, Rogaland. A physical therapist by education, she was deputy leader of the Norwegian Sporting Association of People with Disabilities 1985–1987. Widvey lives in Oslo, is married and has two children.

References

External links
 
 

1956 births
Living people
People from Karmøy
Members of the Storting
Ministers of Culture of Norway
Petroleum and energy ministers of Norway
Conservative Party (Norway) politicians
Rogaland politicians
Norwegian state secretaries
Women members of the Storting
20th-century Norwegian politicians
20th-century Norwegian women politicians
Women government ministers of Norway
Norwegian women state secretaries
Norwegian physiotherapists